Events in the year 1909 in Bulgaria.

Incumbents

Events 

 FC 13, a football club based in Sofia, was established.

References 

 
1900s in Bulgaria
Years of the 20th century in Bulgaria
Bulgaria
Bulgaria